Longines Chronoscope, also titled Chronoscope, is an American TV series, sponsored by Longines watches, that ran on CBS Television from 1951–1955. The series aired Monday nights at 11 p.m. ET to 11:15 p.m., and expanded to Mondays, Wednesdays, and Fridays at 11 p.m. ET after the first season. More than 600 episodes were aired, but only 482 survive, and these surviving kinescopes were donated by Longines to the National Archives.

The series featured 15-minute episodes with interviews with notable people of the time, including Eleanor Roosevelt, John F. Kennedy, Hubert H. Humphrey, Henry Wallace, Robert Moses, Richard E. Byrd, Joseph McCarthy, Earl Warren, Arthur Bliss Lane, John V. Beamer, Tadeusz "Bór" Komorowski and Clare Boothe Luce. The show was hosted by William Bradford Huie, Larry LeSueur, and Henry Hazlitt.

Journalist Frank W. Taylor and business affairs consultant Henry Hazlitt were regular members of the three-person panel. The third panelist for each episode was a guest selected for having particular knowledge related to the guest for that show. Frank Knight was the moderator.

In February 1954, Clark Getts, former producer of Longines Chronoscope, sued CBS for $150,000, alleging that the network had caused Longines to break its contract with him.

The program's demise resulted from a disagreement between CBS and the sponsor regarding control. Network officials felt that CBS should have control, because the program involved discussions of controversial public affairs; Longines executives felt that the company should retain control.

In 1956, Chronoscope was included in a Congressional subcommittee's investigation of network operations. Getts, CBS executives, and a Longines-Wittnauer official were among the witnesses who appeared before the subcommittee headed by Representative Emanuel Cellar.

See also 
 Television news in the United States
 Public affairs (broadcasting)

References

External links

 “Television Interviews, 1951-1955: A Catalog of Longines Chronoscope Interviews in the National Archives”. Compiled by Sarah L. Shamley. National Archives and Records Administration, 1990.
 Yazbeck, Alessandro Balteo & Media Farzin. “Screen Play: Chronoscope, 1951, 11PM”. mitpressjournal.org (pp. 132–147)
 Longines Chronoscope at IMDB
 Chronoscope interview with Henry Wallace, broadcast 12/28/51, Retrieved September 10, 2013
 Chronoscope interview with Earl Warren, broadcast 4/11/52, Retrieved September 12, 2013
 Chronoscope interview with John F. Kennedy, broadcast 8/22/52, Retrieved September 12, 2013
 Chronoscope interview with Kenneth Younger, broadcast 10/19/53, Retrieved February 12, 2020
 Chronoscope interview with Humbert H. Humphrey, broadcast 12/2/53, Retrieved September 12, 2013
 Chronoscope interview with John V. Beamer, broadcast 3/10/1952, Retrieved February 18, 2015
 
 

American television talk shows
1951 American television series debuts
1955 American television series endings
CBS original programming